The dwarf bittern (Ixobrychus sturmii) is a species of heron in the family Ardeidae.

Distribution
It is found in Angola, Benin, Botswana, Burkina Faso, Burundi, Cameroon, Central African Republic, Chad, Republic of the Congo, Democratic Republic of the Congo, Ivory Coast, Equatorial Guinea, Eswatini, Ethiopia, Gabon, Gambia, Ghana, Guinea, Kenya, Liberia, Malawi, Mali, Mauritania, Mozambique, Namibia, Niger, Nigeria, Rwanda, Senegal, Sierra Leone, Somalia, South Africa, Spain (the Canary Islands), Sudan, Tanzania, Togo, Uganda, Zambia, and Zimbabwe. It is a rare vagrant in the Western Palearctic (which consists of Europe, North Africa and the Middle East), with several sightings in the Canary Islands. Two individual were observed on the island of Fuerteventura in the Canary Islands in the winter of 2017.

Description
It is a small bittern, and the same size as the little bittern, to which it is closely related.

Conservation
It is designated least concern.

References

Ixobrychus
Taxonomy articles created by Polbot